Indiana's 1st Senate district is one of the fifty districts of the Indiana Senate. The district was originally based around Hammond and parts of surrounding areas. Redistricting passed by the Indiana General Assembly in 2011 shifted the district's boundaries, effective January 2013. The district was changed to include Hammond's 4th, 5th, 6th city districts, the town of Munster, the town of Highland, the west side of the town of Griffith, the north side of the town of Dyer, parts of the town of Schererville, and part of the City of Crown Point.

The district is currently represented by Dan Dernulc a member of the Republican Party of Indiana
A single term is 4 years in length. Prior to 1970 State Senators only conducted legislative business every 2 years.

List of state senators

Historical election results

References 

Indiana General Assembly
Indiana State Senate districts